Pietro Borsari (24 November 1894 – 4 December 1959) was a Swiss sculptor. His work was part of the sculpture event in the art competition at the 1928 Summer Olympics.

References

1894 births
1959 deaths
20th-century Swiss sculptors
20th-century Swiss male artists
Swiss sculptors
Olympic competitors in art competitions
People from Lugano